This is a list of Ecuadorian universities, grouped by location:

Ambato
Universidad Técnica de Ambato

Cuenca
Politecnica Salesiana University
Universidad Católica de Cuenca
Universidad de Cuenca
Universidad del Azuay

Guayaquil
Blue Hill College
Brookdale College Ecuador
Escuela Superior Politecnica del Litoral
Instituto Superior de Arte Culinario
Politecnica Salesiana University
Universidad Agraria del Ecuador
Universidad Casa Grande
Universidad Católica de Santiago de Guayaquil
Universidad de Especialidades Espíritu Santo
Universidad Ecotec 
Universidad Laica Vicente Rocafuerte de Guayaquil
Universidad de Guayaquil
Universidad Santa María
Universidad Tecnológica Empresarial de Guayaquil
Tecnológico Espíritu Santo

Ibarra
Universidad Técnica del Norte
Pontificia Universidad Catolica del Ecuador - Sede Ibarra
Yachay Tech University

Latacunga
Universidad Técnica de Cotopaxi

Loja
Universidad Nacional de Loja
Universidad Técnica Particular de Loja

Manta
Universidad Laica Eloy Alfaro de Manabí

Portoviejo
Universidad San Gregorio de Portoviejo
Universidad Técnica de Manabí
Pontificia Universidad Catolica del Ecuador sede Manabi

Quevedo
Universidad Técnica Estatal de Quevedo

Quito
Universidad Central del Ecuador
National Polytechnic School
Politecnica Salesiana University
Pontificia Universidad Católica del Ecuador
Universidad Andina Simón Bolívar
Universidad de las Américas
Universidad de los Hemisferios
Universidad Internacional del Ecuador
Universidad Internacional SEK
Universidad San Francisco de Quito
Universidad Tecnológica América
Universidad Tecnológica Equinoccial

Riobamba
Universidad Nacional de Chimborazo

Sangolquí
Escuela Politécnica del Ejército

Tena
Universidad Regional Amazonica IKIAM

Tulcán
Universidad Politécnica Estatal del Carchi

Multi-city (Cuenca, Guayaquil, and Quito)
Universidad Del Pacífico
Politecnica Salesiana University

See also

References

External links 

Universities in Ecuador by region
Complete list of universities in Ecuador

Universities
Ecuador

Ecuador